Ingrid Brocková (born 13 September 1963) is a Slovak diplomat. Since 2020, she has served as the State Secretary at the Ministry of Foreign and European Affairs. In the past, she had been the World Bank representative in Slovakia (2001-2008) and Slovakia's permanent envoy to OECD (2009-2015).

She grew up in Žiar nad Hronom and attended a high school in Kežmarok. In 1986 she graduated in Economics at the Slovak University of Technology in Bratislava. She also obtained a Candidate of Sciences degree at the same university in 1991. She also studied International Relations at the Comenius University and International Public Policy at the Johns Hopkins University in the US.

References 

1963 births
Living people
Slovak diplomats
World Bank people
Johns Hopkins University alumni
Slovak University of Technology in Bratislava alumni
Comenius University alumni
People from Bratislava